Nicolai Andreas Grevstad (2 June 1851 – 20 February 1940) was an American diplomat, politician and newspaper editor.

Background
Nicolai Andreas Grevstad was born in Sunnmøre, the southernmost traditional district of the western Norwegian county of Møre og Romsdal. He graduated with a degree in law from the University of Christiania in 1878. In 1880 he became editor of Dagbladet, Norway's third largest newspaper. Founded in 1869, the newspaper was affiliated with the Liberal Party of Norway (Norwegian: Venstre). A split in the party caused the dismissal of Grevstad in 1883 because of his somewhat pronounced radical political positions.

Career
Grevstad subsequently emigrated to the United States and soon became editor of Nordvesten, a Norwegian language newspaper published in St. Paul, Minnesota. Grevstad’s  mastery of the English language was so excellent that he was a leading editorial writer on the Minneapolis Tribune for two years, and he later edited the Minneapolis Times. Grevstad also served as director of Scandinavian publicity for the Minnesota Commission of Public Safety .
 
In 1886, he returned to Norway at the request of the Liberal Party leader Johan Sverdrup, who served as prime minister after the introduction of the parliamentary system the prior year. Sverdrup served as Prime Minister of Norway from 1884 until 1889. Grevstad subsequently returned to the Minnesota and became an editorial writer for a number of English language newspapers in Minneapolis. 

From 1892 to 1911, he was editor of Skandinaven, the largest Norwegian language newspaper in Chicago, Illinois. For a period he was a member of the Illinois General Assembly. In 1906, he was knighted into the Royal Norwegian Order of St. Olav. In 1911, he became an Ambassador of the United States to Uruguay and Paraguay.

In 1930, Grevstad, wrote Norwegian-American Hospital, Chicago which provided a concise historic sketch of the north side Chicago hospital which had been founded by Norwegian immigrants. Grevstad later returned to newspaper work and in 1930 again became editor of Skandinaven.  Grevstad emphasized the growing importance of Skandinaven in politics by printing many of his editorials in English as well as Norwegian. Under his editorship, the paper reached the height of its circulation and influence in the first decade of the twentieth century. After Grevstad’s death, the paper would be edited by Reidar Rye Haugan.

References

Additional sources
 Hammer, Simon Christian (1929) Nicolai Andreas Grevstad (Norsk biografisk leksikon. H. Aschehoug & Co. Volume 4)

External links
Norwegian-American Historical Association
United States Department of State

19th-century American newspaper editors
Norwegian editors
American Lutherans
1851 births
1940 deaths
Recipients of the St. Olav's Medal
Norwegian emigrants to the United States
Ambassadors of the United States to Uruguay
Ambassadors of the United States to Paraguay